The Rachel Creefield silhouette (c. 1825) is believed to be the earliest known hollow-cut silhouette of an African-American woman. It is held in the collection of the Smithsonian.

Rachel Creefield was employed by the Dickey family of Chester County, Pennsylvania. The silhouette is one of six likely created at the Peale Museum of family members of Creefield's employers, including John Miller Dickey. Creefield is believed to have been a domestic servant in the household of Ebenezer Dickey.

The silhouette is "cut from off-white wove paper and backed with black paper (with a positive image of the bust transferred in brown onto the backing sheet)."

See also 

 Moses Williams, a Black silhouette cutter whose own 1803 silhouette is the earliest known of an African-American

References

Further reading 

 Chester County Historical Society. Miller-Dickey Family Papers (MS. Coll. 142)
 Chester County Negro Servant Returns, 1788-1821
 Account Book (1831 to 1847) of Jane Miller Dickey
 Abstracts, Notes, and Comment by Thomas A. Urbine, Jr. (1977)
 John Bradley. The Dickey Family (1990)

Black people in art
1820s in Pennsylvania
Silhouettes
Drawings of people